KCZQ (102.3 FM) is a commercial radio station that serves the Cresco, Iowa area.  The station primarily broadcasts music in an oldies format, with polka music on Saturdays. KCZQ is licensed to Mega Media, Ltd.  KCZQ does not live stream so the listening base is limited to North-East Iowa.

The transmitter and broadcast tower are located about 4 miles northwest of Cresco on 60th Street.

References

External links

CZQ